The 1988 Polish Speedway season was the 1988 season of motorcycle speedway in Poland.

Individual

Polish Individual Speedway Championship
The 1988 Individual Speedway Polish Championship final was held over 2 days on 24 and 25 August at Leszno.

Golden Helmet
The 1988 Golden Golden Helmet organised by the Polish Motor Union (PZM) was the 1988 event for the league's leading riders. The final was held over four rounds.

Pairs

Polish Pairs Speedway Championship
The 1988 Polish Pairs Speedway Championship was the 1988 edition of the Polish Pairs Speedway Championship. The final was held on 4 May at Rybnik.

Junior Championship
 winner - Piotr Świst

Silver Helmet
 winner - Jarosław Olszewski

Bronze Helmet
 winner - Jarosław Olszewski

Team

Team Speedway Polish Championship
The 1988 Team Speedway Polish Championship was the 1988 edition of the Team Polish Championship. 

Unia Leszno won the gold medal for the second consecutive season. The team included Roman Jankowski, Zenon Kasprzak, Piotr Pawlicki Sr. and Jan Krzystyniak.

First League

Second League

References

Poland Individual
Poland Team
Speedway
1988 in Polish speedway